The American Amateur Hockey League was an amateur ice hockey league in the United States. The league was founded in 1896, and was based in New York City and New Jersey, until 1914, when the Boston AA joined the league. In the 1900–01 season a team from Philadelphia, the Quaker City Hockey Club, also played in the AAHL. The league ceased operations after the 1916–17 season.

Players
Hobey Baker, famous American athlete and inducted into the Hockey Hall of Fame in 1945, played two seasons in the league for the St. Nicholas Hockey Club between 1914–1916. Sprague Cleghorn, another Hockey Hall of Fame member, spent the 1909–10 season with the New York Wanderers, as did his brother Odie Cleghorn.

During St. Nicholas Hockey Club's inaugural season in the league, in 1896–97, the team was represented by several notable American tennis players, among them William Larned, Henry Slocum, Malcolm Chace and Robert Wrenn. Canadian middle-distance runner and Olympic gold medalist George Orton played for the Quaker City Hockey Club in 1900–01, as did 1906 US Open tennis champion William Clothier.

A great bulk of the players in the AAHL came from different Ivy League schools such as Harvard, Princeton, Columbia and Yale. 
Among them were United States Senator Leverett Saltonstall and prominent businessman Harold Stanley. The league also had many Canadian players on its teams, among them Tom "Attie" Howard, Bob Wall, Bill Dobby, Artie Liffiton and Riley Castleman.

Teams

Crescent Athletic Club, "Brooklyn Crescents", 1896–97, 1899–1917
Brooklyn Skating Club, 1896–1906
New York Athletic Club, "Winged Footers" or "Mercury Footers", 1896–1912
New York Hockey Club, 1897–1917
New York Wanderers, 1903–1905, 1907–1910, 1911–12, 1913–14
St. Nicholas Hockey Club, 1896–1903, 1905–1917
Montclair Athletic Club, New Jersey, 1897–1899
New York Naval Reserves, 1899–1900
Quaker City Hockey Club, Philadelphia, 1900–01
New York Irish-Americans, 1912–1915, 1916–17
Boston Athletic Association, 1914–1917
Harvard Club, Boston, 1915–16
Boston Arena Hockey Club, 1916–17
Boston Hockey Club, 1916–17

Champions
1896–97: New York Athletic Club
1897–98: New York Athletic Club
1898–99: Brooklyn Skating Club
1899–1900: Brooklyn Crescents
1900–01: Brooklyn Crescents
1901–02: Brooklyn Crescents
1902–03: Brooklyn Crescents
1903–04: New York Wanderers
1904–05: Brooklyn Crescents
1905–06: Brooklyn Crescents
1906–07: St. Nicholas Hockey Club
1907–08: Brooklyn Crescents
1908–09: New York Athletic Club
1909–10: New York Athletic Club
1910–11: Brooklyn Crescents
1911–12: Brooklyn Crescents
1912–13: New York Hockey Club
1913–14: St. Nicholas Hockey Club
1914–15: St. Nicholas Hockey Club
1915–16: Boston Athletic Association
1916–17: Boston Athletic Association

Source:

References
League profile
Society for International Hockey Research at sihrhockey.org

Notes

Defunct ice hockey leagues in the United States